Lucerna is a genus of air-breathing land snails, terrestrial pulmonate gastropod mollusks in the subfamily Lucerninae of the family Pleurodontidae.

Species
Species within the genus Lucerna include:
 Lucerna bainbridgii (L. Pfeiffer, 1845)
 † Lucerna bernardi (Kimball, 1947) 
 † Lucerna bowdeniana (Simpson, 1895) 
 Lucerna chemnitziana (L. Pfeiffer, 1845)
 Lucerna lamarckii (Férussac, 1821)
 Lucerna lucerna (O. F. Müller, 1774)
 Lucerna mora (Gray in Griffith & Pidgeon, 1833)
 Lucerna subacuta (L. Pfeiffer, 1867)
 Lucerna sublucerna Pilsbry, 1889
 Lucerna vacillans Vendreyes, 1902
Synonyms
 Lucerna (Lucidula) Swainson, 1840: synonym of Pleurodonte Fischer von Waldheim, 1807

References

External links 
 Swainson, W. (1840). A treatise on malacology or shells and shell-fish. London, Longman. viii + 419 pp
 Sei M., Robinson D.G., Geneva A.J. & Rosenberg G. (2017). Doubled helix: Sagdoidea is the overlooked sister group of Helicoidea (Mollusca: Gastropoda: Pulmonata). Biological Journal of the Linnean Society. 122(4): 697-728

Pleurodontidae
Gastropod genera